Quincy National Cemetery is a small United States National Cemetery located in the city of Quincy, in Adams County, Illinois. Administered by the United States Department of Veterans Affairs, it encompasses slightly less than a half an acre, and as 2014, had 690 interments. It is currently closed to new interments, and is maintained by Rock Island National Cemetery.

History 
Originally a plot within Woodland Cemetery, the first burials took place in 1861. It was designated a National Cemetery on July 24, 1882.

In 1899, without explanation, a lot within Graceland Cemetery, in Adams County, Ill., was purchased and all the interments were transferred there from the plot in Woodland Cemetery. More modern changes to the cemetery have divided it from Graceland so as to be its own cemetery.

Sometime between 1936 and 1949, a fence dividing Graceland and the National Cemetery was improperly placed.  An act of Congress was passed in 1953 (Public Law 116), to rectify the resulting property dispute.

Notable monuments 
 Three gun monuments the New York Arsenal.

References

External links
 National Cemetery Administration
 Quincy National Cemetery
 
 
 

Buildings and structures in Quincy, Illinois
Cemeteries on the National Register of Historic Places in Illinois
Historic American Landscapes Survey in Illinois
Illinois in the American Civil War
National Register of Historic Places in Adams County, Illinois
Protected areas of Adams County, Illinois
United States national cemeteries
Tourist attractions in Quincy, Illinois
1861 establishments in Illinois